Eyes of a Thief is a 2014 Palestinian drama film directed by Najwa Najjar. It is Najjar's second feature film, and is based in part on an incident that took place in Silwad in 2002. It was selected as the Palestinian entry for the Best Foreign Language Film at the 87th Academy Awards, but was not nominated. The film is set in the West Bank. Its world premiere took place at the Ramallah Cultural Palace in Ramallah, Palestine.

Cast
 Khaled Abol Naga as Tarek Khedr
 Souad Massi as Lila
 Nisreen Faour as Duniya
 Maisa Abd Elhadi as Houda (as Maisa Abdel Hadi)
 Areen Omari as Salwa

See also
 List of submissions to the 87th Academy Awards for Best Foreign Language Film
 List of Palestinian submissions for the Academy Award for Best Foreign Language Film
 List of Palestinian films

References

External links
 

2014 films
2014 drama films
Palestinian drama films
2010s Arabic-language films